Paul McNulty (born 1953) is a builder of historical pianos, described by the New Grove as "famous for the high standard of [his] instruments." Within the community of builders, McNulty is noted for his efforts to extend the production of historically informed instruments later into history:  while he has built many fortepianos in 18th-century style, he has also progressively sought to span the gap between the fortepiano (the cradle of modern historical-piano construction) and the fully modern piano that emerged around the last third of the 19th century. The expanding diversity of McNulty's productions has thus helped "provide an opportunity to extend keyboard performing practice to include the piano repertory of the 19th century" (New Grove).

Life
He was born in 1953 in Houston, Texas. In 1976 he attended the Peabody Conservatory, studying classical guitar, then became interested in historical instruments, studying lute performance, etc. In 1978 he entered the New England School of Stringed Keyboard Instrument Technology, where he studied under Bill Garlick. At his final examination McNulty gained the highest possible qualification: "tuning examiner". He attended a seminar at the Steinway factory in New York and was recruited to work there as a technician, but chose instead to embark on a career as a fortepiano builder, and served his apprenticeship for two years under Robert Smith in Somerville, Massachusetts.

In 1986 John Gibbons invited McNulty to accompany his European tour with Frans Brüggen's Orchestra of the Eighteenth Century. Gibbons performed Mozart's concertos K.491 and K.466. In the same year McNulty moved to Amsterdam. The search for the best materials led McNulty to move to the Czech Republic. It was written that Viennese piano makers preferred to get their soundboards from the Schwarzenberg Forest (now Šumava) in southern Bohemia. Since 1995 McNulty has been living and working in Divišov, a small Czech town. In 2004 he married Russian-Canadian fortepianist Viviana Sofronitsky.

McNulty's fortepiano was purchased by Norwegian Academy of Music in Oslo. It is worth mentioning that the Austrian pianist Paul Badura-Skoda also placed an order, as did Trevor Pinnock, ordering a fortepiano for a concert at Carnegie Hall. In September 2018 McNulty fortepianos Graf copy 1819, Pleyel 1830 and Buchholtz 1826 were used in the first International Chopin Competition on Period Instruments.

McNulty's fortepianos

At present, McNulty builds fortepianos suitable for performances of piano works from Carl Philipp Emanuel Bach, Mozart and Beethoven to Chopin, Liszt and Brahms.

In 2009, McNulty produced the first modern copy of a French piano, a Pleyel, which was Chopin's favorite brand. In 2011, at request of Klassik Stiftung Weimar he reproduced one of Liszt's personal pianos, the Boisselot op. 2800. This instrument was made in 1846 for Liszt's 1847 Russian tour. In 2015 McNulty extended his list of first modern copies with Streicher piano, Johannes Brahms' favourite piano model. In 2020 Paul McNulty produced his first Silbermann fortepiano for prof. Malcolm Bilson.

Since 1985 McNulty has made more than 300 pianos, with customers from different countries. USA: Harvard University, Cornell University, Stanford University, Oberlin College, Malcolm Bilson, Robert Levin, Vladimir Feltsman; England: Kristian Bezuidenhout, Pawel Siwczak (whose instrument was played by Sir András Schiff in Wigmore Hall), Glyndebourne Festival, Royal Academy of Music (London), Royal College of Music (London); Austria: Nikolaus Harnoncourt, Paul Badura-Skoda, Wien Konservatorium Privatuniversitat, Vienna Volksoper; France: Opera National de Paris, Paris Conservatoire CNSMDP, Katia & Marielle Labeque. Australia: Geoffrey Lancaster, Australian National University, Melbourne Recital Center. Poland: Chopin's Institute Warsaw; Germany: Klassik Stiftung Weimar, Trossingen, Koeln and Hannover Hochschule für Musik; Switzerland: Schola Cantorum Basiliensis; Netherlands: Ronald Brautigam, Amsterdam Conservatory, the Royal Conservatory of The Hague;  Denmark: The Royal Danish Opera; China: Central Conservatory Beijing, etc.

List of instruments

 Fortepiano after Silbermann 1749
 Fortepiano after Johann Andreas Stein ca. 1788
 Fortepianos after Anton Walter 1792 and Walter & Sohn ca.1805 
 Fortepiano after J. Fritz 1812
 Fortepianos after Conrad Graf 1819, 1822 and 1836
 Fortepiano after Buchholtz 1826
 Fortepiano after Ignaz Pleyel 1830
 Fortepiano after Boisselot 1846
 Fortepiano after Streicher 1868

Recordings made with McNulty's instruments 

 Ronald Brautigam. Ludwig van Beethoven. Complete works for solo piano. Vol.2. Played on Graf, Walter and Stein piano copies. Label: BIS
 Kristian Bezuidenhout. Wolfgang Amadeus Mozart. Keyboard Music. Vol.2. Played on a copy of Walter piano. Label: Harmonia Mundi
 Viviana Sofronitsky with Warsaw Chamber Opera Orchestra on Period Instruments. Complete Mozart Piano Concertos (11 CD box). Played on a copy of Walter piano. Label: Etcetera
 Viviana Sofronitsky. Franz Schubert. Wanderer Fantasy, Impromptus opp. 90 & 142. Played on a copy of the 1819 Graf piano. Label: CAvi
 Neal Peres De Costa. Pastoral Fables. Works for cor anglais and pianos. Played on a copy of Streicher piano. Label: ABC Classics
 Nikolaus Harnoncourt, Rudolf Buchbinder. Wolfgang Amadeus Mozart. Piano concertos No. 23&25. Played on a copy of Walter piano. Label: Sony
 Paul Badura-Skoda with Musica Florea. Wolfgang Amadeus Mozart. Piano concertos K.271, K.414. Played on a copy of Walter piano. Label: Arcana
 Robert Levin with the Academy of Ancient Music, Christopher Hogwood. Wolfgang Amadeus Mozart. Piano Concertos K271 & K414.  Played on a copy of Walter piano. Label:  L'Oiseau-Lyre
 Krzysztof Książek. Fryderyk Chopin, Karol Kurpiński. Piano Concerto No.2 f-moll (solo version), Mazurkas, Ballade; Fugue & Coda B-dur. Played on a copy of Buchholtz piano. Label: NIFCCD
 Music video: Pawel Siwczak, Ludwig van Beethoven, Adagio sostenuto "Quasi una fantasia" from Sonata No. 14 in C-sharp Minor, Op. 27 No. 2 ("Moonlight Sonata"). Played on Walter & Sohn piano copy. Label: Bach Club
 Viviana Sofronitsky, Sergei Istomin. Fryderyk Chopin. Complete works for cello and piano. Played on copies of the 1830 Pleyel and 1819 Graf pianos. Label: Passacaille

See also
 Piano history and musical performance

References

External links
 Paul McNulty official website
 Recreating Mozart-era pianos in Czech wood. CTW News
Buchholtz piano copy made by Paul McNulty
 Ronald Brautigam on historical pianos made by Paul McNulty
Brahms' Streicher piano restored by Paul McNulty (in French)
An interview with Paul McNulty and Viviana Sofronitsky. Radio Prague International 
 Paul McNulty, one of the most highly respected builders working today. Prague Morning
 Paul McNulty fortepianos. Early Music News
 Exploring the sound world of Chopin on period pianos
 Pleyel 1830 copy by Paul McNulty. The Fryderyk Chopin Institute 
 Period Pianos - The Fryderyk Chopin Institute Collection
 The International Chopin Competition on Period Instruments
 Adagio from Beethoven's "Moonlight Sonata" played by Pawel Siwczak on McNulty's Walter & Sohn. VEVO music video.

Piano makers
Piano manufacturing companies
Musical instrument manufacturing companies of the Czech Republic
Living people
1953 births